Bruce N. Whitman (August 4, 1933 – October 10, 2018) was an aviation industry professional and CEO of FlightSafety International. In 2014, he was awarded the Lifetime Aviation Industry Leader Award by the Living Legends of Aviation. On 23 March 2017, he received an award by the Medal of Honor Society. On 3 October 2018, he was inducted into the International Air & Space Hall of Fame. Whitman was also the 2018 recipient of the Philip J. Klass Award for Lifetime Achievement.

Early life
Whitman graduated Trinity College in Hartford, Connecticut in 1955 and served in the United States Air Force as a pilot, navigator and bombardier. In 1957, he served as Assistant to the Commander, Homestead Air Force Base.

References 

1933 births
2018 deaths
American aviators
American aviation businesspeople
People from New York City
Trinity College (Connecticut) alumni
United States Air Force officers
American chief executives